Faraz Khan (born 12 September 1993 in Trenton, NJ) is an American professional squash player. As of February 2018, he was ranked number 86 in the world.

References

1993 births
Living people
American male squash players
Competitors at the 2022 World Games